The golden-collared manakin (Manacus vitellinus) is a species of bird in the family Pipridae.

It is found in Colombia and Panama. Its natural habitats are subtropical or tropical moist lowland forest and heavily degraded former forest.

Reproduction 
Male golden-collared manakins perform an acrobatic display and use vocalizations to court females. Males emit a specific chee-poo sound during courtship. Studies have examined whether the call of golden-collared manakins is physiologically controlled by peripheral androgen receptors.  When androgen receptors outside of the central nervous system were inhibited, this resulted in an increase in the duration of the chee note and a decrease in the frequency of the poo note. These results show that the activation of peripheral androgen receptors is important for creating a normal sexual call in the golden-collared manakin.

References

golden-collared manakin
Birds of Colombia
Birds of Panama
golden-collared manakin
Taxonomy articles created by Polbot